Radychiv (Ukrainian Радичів; German: Raditschew; English, connected with the Hutterites: Radichev) is a small village in Novhorod-Siverskyi Raion, Chernihiv Oblast, Ukraine. The population is about 800 people. The village is located on the right bank of the Desna River. It belongs to Ponornytsia urban hromada, one of the hromadas of Ukraine. 

The village played an important role in the history of the Hutterites, because all Hutterite, leaving Vishenka, lived there from 1802 to 1842.

Until 18 July 2020, Radychiv belonged to Korop Raion. The raion was abolished in July 2020 as part of the administrative reform of Ukraine, which reduced the number of raions of Chernihiv Oblast to five. The area of Korop Raion was merged into Novhorod-Siverskyi Raion.

References 

Hutterite communities in Europe
Hutterites in Ukraine
Villages in Novhorod-Siverskyi Raion